Nikolai Lopatnikoff (born Russian, Николай Львович Лопатников/Nikolai Lwowitsch Lopatnikow; 16 March 1903 in Tallinn - 7 October 1976 in Pittsburgh, Pennsylvania) was a Russian-American composer, music teacher and university lecturer. He composed some works of neoclassical music. These pieces featured fast, furious Allegro molto that included in some cases snare drumming and also soft cello music. These style alternate fast and furious with quiet and solemn, legato strings giving way to a quiet passage that ends with a loud drum.

Life

Europe 

Lopatnikoff studied music theory and piano at the Conservatory of St. Petersburg, until he fled the Russian Revolution with his family in 1917, landing in Helsinki, Finland.  He continued his studies at the Sibelius Academy in Helsinki until 1920.

By 1921 his family had settled in Heidelberg, Germany where he began studying engineering at the University of Karlsruhe (Technischen Hochschule Karlsruhe), graduating in 1927. At the same time he was studying composition with Ernst Toch, Hermann Grabner and Willi Rehberg at the conservatory in Mannheim (Staatliche Hochschule für Musik und Darstellende Kunst Mannheim) and also in Berlin.

During this time, he composed the Piano Concerto No. 1 Op. 5, the 2nd Concerto for Piano and Orchestra, Op. 15 and Symphony No. 1, Op. 12. This symphony was performed by many orchestras in Europe and the USA and in 1932 by the Philadelphia Orchestra played on tour. For the "German Chamber Music Baden-Baden 1927", a follow-up event of the Donaueschingen Music Days 1926, he composed as well as George Antheil pieces for mechanical piano "Welte-Mignon". Aaron Copland, who heard this performance on 16 July 1927, acquainted Sergei Koussevitzky aware of it and so initiated a contact that would be decisive for Lopatnikoff's future. Koussevitzky engaged Lopatnikoff to orchestrate the pieces and offered cooperation. As a result, a long-standing connection between the two came about, which led to the premier of numerous Lopatnikoff works by the Boston Symphony Orchestra.

America
After working in the 1930s in Berlin, and beginning 1936 in London, mainly as a composer, he emigrated to the United States in 1939. He served as a professor of composition at the Hartt School of Music in Hartford, Connecticut, the Westchester Conservatory of Music in White Plains, New York and ultimately at the Carnegie Institute of Technology, now called Carnegie Mellon University in Pittsburgh, Pennsylvania. In 1944 he became an American citizen. He taught music theory and composition at Carnegie Mellon until his retirement in 1969. He died at his home in the Squirrel Hill neighborhood of Pittsburgh in 1976. He and his wife, poet Sara Henderson Hay, are buried at Pittsburgh's Homewood Cemetery.

His archive is located in the Library of Congress.

Works
 Four Little Piano Pieces, Op. 1
 Prelude and Fugue, Op. 2
 Prelude to a Drama for Large Orchestra, Op. 3 (ca. 1922)
 First Concerto for Piano and Orchestra in C major, Op. 5a, premiered in Karlsruhe in 1927
 Concerto for Piano and Orchestra, Op. 5b
 Deuxième Quatuor, Quartet No. 2, Op. 6
 Deuxième Quatuor en ut pour deux Violons, Alto et Violoncelle, Op. 6a; Leipzig: MP Belaieff 1933
 Sonatine pour piano, Op. 7 (1928); Paris: Edition Russe de Musique, 1928
 Duo for Violin and Cello, Op. 8; Berlin: Edition Russe de Musique
 Sonata for violin, piano et tambour militaire, Op. 9; Berlin: Edition Russe de Musique, 1928
 Introduction et Scherzo (for orchestra), Op. 10; Paris: Edition Russe de Musique
 Sonate pour Violoncelle et Piano (Sonata for cello and piano), Op. 11; Paris: Edition Russe de Musique
 Symphony No. 1, Op. 12; Mainz: Schott
 Deux Danses ironiques, pour piano, Op. 13; Paris: Edition Russe de Musique
 Second Concerto for Piano and Orchestra, Op. 15 (My parents dedicated); Mainz: Schott 1950
 5 contrasts for Piano (Five Contrasts), Op. 16; Mainz: Schott 1950
 3 Pieces for Violin and Piano (Three Pieces for Violin and Piano), Op. 17, Mainz: Schott oJ
 Dialogues: Five Pieces for Piano, Op. 18 (1934); Mainz: Schott undated.
 Danton, opera in three acts, Op. 20 (by Georg Büchner )
 Danton Suite, Op. 21
 Variations for Piano (Variations for Piano), Op. 22; Mainz: Schott 1950
 Mädchenlied; Abendfrieden; Evening transition; Good night ...; I noticed ...; In April.
 Piano Trio (Trio en la mineur pour piano, violin and cello), Op. 23
 Symphony No. 2, Op. 24
 Violin Concerto, Op. 26; New York: Associated Music Publishers, 1944
 Sinfonietta, Op. 27; New York: Associated Music Publishers, 1949
 Opus sinfonicum (for orchestra), Op. 28; New York: Leeds Music Corporation, 1951
 Sonata for Piano No.1 in E Major, Op. 29 (about 1943); New York: Associated Music Publishers, 1946
 Concertino for Orchestra, Op. 30; New York: Leeds Music Corporation, 1953
 Variations and Epilogue for violin and cello, Op. 31 (about 1946); New York: Edward B. Marks Music Corporation, 1948
 Variations and Epilogue for Cello and Orchestra, Op. 31a
 Sonata No. 2 for violin and piano, Op. 32
 Concerto for 2 Pianos, Op. 33; New York: Leeds Music Corporation, 1953
 Divertimento for Orchestra, Op. 34; New York: Leeds Music Corporation, 1954
 Sonata for Violin and Piano No. 2, Op. 32; New York: Leeds Music Corporation, 1951
 Concerto for 2 Pianos and Orchestra, Op. 33 (1949)
 Symphony No. 3, Op. 35; New York: Leeds Music Corporation, 1951
 Quartet No. 3 for Strings, Op. 36
 Intervals, 7 studies for piano, Op. 37; New York: Leeds Music Corporation, 1957
 Variazioni concertanti, op 38, for orchestra. New York: Leeds Music Corporation, 1963
 Music for orchestra, Op. 39; New York: Leeds Music Corporation, 1960
 Music for Band, Op. 39a, Arranged by William A. Schaefer from the composer's Op. 39
 Festival Overture, Op. 40; New York: Leeds Music Corporation, 1965
 Concerto for Wind Symphony Orchestra, Op. 41
 Fantasia Concertante: for violin and pianio, Op. 42 (1962); New York: MCA Music 1967
 Concerto for Orchestra, Op. 43 (circa 1964); New York: CF Peters Corporation, 1964
 Divertimento da camera, for flute, oboe, clarinet, bassoon, horn, trumpet, violin, cello, percussion and piano, Op. 44
 Partita concertante, for chamber orchestra, Op. 45
 Symphony No. 4, Op. 46

Works without opus number
 Arabesque, for two pianos, four hands (about 1948); New York: Associated Music Publishers, 1948
 Arabesque for cello or bassoon and piano (1950); New York: Leeds Music Corporation, 1950
 Arietta, for violin and piano; New York: G. Schirmer, 1943
 CHASE, for unidentified treble instrument and piano
 Dance piece for piano (edited by Isadore Freed) (1956)
 Dance piece for piano; Bryn Mawr, PA: Theodore Presser Co. 1956
 Eksprompt [Impromptu] and Prelude (for piano solo)
 Elegietta for cello and piano (1934); Mainz: Schott
 Gavotte (for piano solo); Paris: Les Editions de la Sirène Musicale 1929
 Melting-Pot, ballet in six scenes
 Sinfonietta for chamber orchestra (ca. 1949); New York: Music Press, 1947
 Time is Infinite Movement, for Three Voices (1947)
 Toccata for piano (original composition for mechanical piano Welte-Mignon ) (1927)
 Romans [Romance], for voice and piano (1923) on a text by Akhmatova (Karlsruhe 1931)
 Romans [Romance], for voice and piano (1924) on a text by Tiucher
 Scherzo (original composition for mechanical piano Welte-Mignon) (1927)
 Variations and Epilogue for cello and piano

Further reading 
Nikolai Lopatnikoff. Forecast and Review. New Life in Berlin. In: Modern Music VI/4, 1929.
 Fred K. Prieberg: Lexikon der Neuen Musik. Freiburg: Alber-Verlag, 1958, S. 259 f.
 Die Musik in Geschichte und Gegenwart (MGG), Band 8, S. 1194, 1. Auflg. Kassel 1965 (dort angegebenes Geburtsdatum ist falsch).
 Nanette Kaplan Solomon: The solo piano music of Nikolai Lopatnikoff: 1903 - 1976. Univ. Microfilms Internat., Ann Arbor, MI. Boston Univ., Diss. 1987.

External links 

 Nikolai Lopatnikoff Collection, Library of Congress

References 

Russian composers
Russian male composers
American male composers
1903 births
1976 deaths
20th-century American composers
Burials at Homewood Cemetery
20th-century American male musicians
Neoclassical composers
White Russian emigrants to Germany
German emigrants to the United States